The International Federation of Shipmasters' Associations (IFSMA), is the international professional organisation that unites and represents the world's serving Shipmasters.

The IFSMA is primarily concerned with representing the interests of the serving Shipmasters in bodies such as the International Maritime Organization, the International Labour Organization and other relevant, international and national organisations.

The purpose of IFSMA is to bring the Shipmasters' views on matters of marine safety, maritime security and protection of the marine environment to recognition at the required level and, at the same time, to forge a more exclusive and professional status for Shipmasters, one based upon their professional responsibility toward both shipowners and society.

The IFSMA is concerned about both international standards of professional competence for seafarers and  international standards on conditions of work for seafarers.

The IFSMA is a federation with a policy to ensure safe operational practices, to prevent human injury, to protect the marine environment and to ensure the safety of life and property at sea.

The IFSMA headquarters are located in London, United Kingdom.

About IFSMA

History
IFSMA was formed by eight National Shipmasters' Associations and formally constituted on 1 January 1974, in Rotterdam  with the aim to unite the world's serving Shipmasters into a single non-profit making international professional organisation.

The IFSMA office was moved to London in 1983 for close proximity to the London headquarters of the United Nations (UN) International Maritime Organization (IMO) at which IFSMA had been granted consultative status in 1975, only one year after IFSMAs inauguration. This consultative status as a Non-Government Organisation (NGO) enables IFSMA to represent the views and  protect the interests of the serving Shipmasters unfettered and unfiltered either by national governments or by shipping companies.

In February 1993, IFSMA was placed on the International Labour Organization’s (ILO) Special List of Non-Governmental International Organisations.

In the beginning of 2011, IFSMA started the MasterMarinerBenefitProgram™ a specialized benefit program for all serving Shipmasters, who are either a member of one of the IFSMA Member Associations or an IFSMA Individual Member.

In 2014, over 16,000 Shipmasters from almost 60 different countries are affiliated to IFSMA, either through their National Associations or as Individual Members.

IFSMA Founding Associations
IFSMA, the International Federation of Shipmasters' Associations was founded in 1974 by the following eight National Shipmasters' Associations:
 Association Nationale des Officiers et Marine du Commerce, Le Maillon, Paris, France
 Collegio Nazionale Patentati Capitani L.C. e D.M., Genova, Italy
 The Irish Institute of Master Mariners, Dublin, Ireland
 Koninklijk Belgisch Zeemannscollege, Antwerp, Belgium
 Nederlandse Vereniging van Kapiteins ter Koopvaardij, Rotterdam, Netherlands
 Norges Skibsforerforbund, Oslo, Norway
 The Society of Master Mariners South Africa, Cape Town, South Africa
 Verband Deutscher Kapitäne und Schiffsoffiziere, Hamburg, Germany

Presidents

Secretaries General

IFSMA Senior Officer Legal Insurance Cover

Senior Officer Legal Insurance

The policy of insurance shall be for the benefit of the nominated Ship Master and Chief Engineer and deemed thereafter to be the assured and shall remain in force throughout the currency of the policy whilst the assured is performing his or her duties as a Ship Master/Chief Engineer whilst officially assigned to a vessel.

The Senior Officer Legal Insurance is fully backed by the well known and leading international marine insurance market Lloyd‘s of London

Senior Officer Legal Insurance provides for:
 Full coverage for defence and legal costs in criminal and civil proceedings up to EUR 1,000,000 or its equivalent
 Loss of Income 
 Civil Liability and Defence
The above list is not exhaustive and the full policy conditions should be consulted before taking advantage of the IFSMA Senior Officer Legal Insurance Cover.

Membership

Member Associations

Honorary Members

See also 

 Seafarer's Professions and Ranks
 Shipmaster
 Master Mariner

 International Maritime Organization
 International Convention for the Prevention of Pollution From Ships (MARPOL, 1973/1978)
 International Convention for the Safety of Life at Sea (SOLAS, 1974)
 International Convention on Standards of Training, Certification and Watchkeeping for Seafarers (STCW, 1978/1995/2010)

 International Labour Organization
 Maritime Labour Convention (MLC, 2006)

External links

International Federation of Shipmasters' Associations
IFSMA's Website
IFSMA's SeaMansWeb.net

IFSMA Member Associations
Website of CCUOMM, the IFSMA Member Association from Argentina
Website of CMMA, the IFSMA Member Association from Australia
Website of KBZ, the IFSMA Member Association from Belgium
Website of SINDMAR, the IFSMA Member Association from Brazil
Website of BSMA, the IFSMA Member Association from Bulgaria
Website of CMMC, the IFSMA Member Association from Canada
Website of NAUTILUS, the IFSMA Member Association from Chile
Website of DMO, the IFSMA Member Association from Denmark
Website of FSN, the IFSMA Member Association from the Faroe Islands
Website of FSOU, the IFSMA Member Association from Finland
Website of ACOMM, the IFSMA Member Association from France
Website of AFCAN, the IFSMA Member Association from France
Website of VDKS, the IFSMA Member Association from Germany
Website of AESM, the IFSMA Member Association from Hong Kong
Website of CMMI, the IFSMA Member Association from India
Website of IIMM, the IFSMA Member Association from Ireland
Website of JCA, the IFSMA Member Association from Japan
Website of LSMA, the IFSMA Member Association from Latvia
Website of NAUTILUS NL, the IFSMA Member Association from the Netherlands
Website of NVKK, the IFSMA Member Association from the Netherlands
Website of NAMM, the IFSMA Member Association from Nigeria
Website of NMOA, the IFSMA Member Association from Norway
Website of MMSP, the IFSMA Member Association from Pakistan
Website of AMOSUP, the IFSMA Member Association from the Philippines
Website of FILSCAPTS, the IFSMA Member Association from the Philippines
Website of FESMA, the IFSMA Member Association from Russia
Website of MSMA, the IFSMA Member Association from Russia
Website of SMOU, the IFSMA Member Association from Singapore
Website of SOMMSA, the IFSMA Member Association from South Africa
Website of AVCMM, the IFSMA Member Association from Spain
Website of MOA, the IFSMA Member Association from Sweden
Website of TOCA, the IFSMA Member Association from Turkey
Website of OSMA, the IFSMA Member Association from Ukraine
Website of NAUTILUS UK, the IFSMA Member Association from the United Kingdom
Website of CAMM, the IFSMA Member Association from the United States of America
Website of IOMMP the IFSMA Member Association from the United States of America

Other Relevant Organisations
Website of BIMCO, the Baltic and International Maritime Council
Website of CESMA, the Confederation of European Shipmasters' Associations
Website of EMSA, the European Maritime Safety Agency
Website of IACS, the International Association of Classification Societies
Website of IALA, the International Association of Marine Aids to Navigation and Lighthouse Authorities
Website of ICS/ISF, the International Chamber of Shipping/International Shipping Federation
Website of ILO, the International Labour Office
Website of IMarEST, the Institute of Marine Engineering, Science and Technology
Website of IMO, the International Maritime Organization
Website of IMPA, the International Maritime Pilots' Association
Website of INTERMANAGER, the InterManager
Website of ISAN, the International Seafarers Assistance Network
Website of ITLOS, the International Tribunal of the Law of the Sea
Website of ITF, the International Transport Workers' Federation
Website of MPHRP, Maritime Piracy - Humanitarian Response
Website of SRI, Seafarers' Rights International
Website of UN, the United Nations

References 

International organisations based in London
International professional associations
Organisations based in the London Borough of Lambeth
Shipmasters
Shipping trade associations
Transport organisations based in the United Kingdom
1974 establishments in the United Kingdom